Käärdi is a small borough in Elva Parish, Tartu County in eastern Estonia.

References

Boroughs and small boroughs in Estonia
Populated places in Tartu County